, son of regent Nijō Haruyoshi, was a Japanese kugyō (court noble) of the Azuchi–Momoyama period and the early Edo period. He held the regent position of kanpaku two times: once in 1585, and again from 1615 to 1619. He married a daughter of daimyō Oda Nobunaga and the couple adopted Kujō Yukiie's son, who became known as Nijō Yasumichi.

References
 

1556 births
1619 deaths
Fujiwara clan
Akizane